Neervilakom (also spelt Neervilakam, Neervilakem, Nirvilakam, Nirvilakom, Nirvilakem) is a village located   from Aranmula. Neervilakom is a suburb of Aranmula panchayath in the extreme west part of pathanamthitta district in the state of Kerala in south India. It is the geographical border of Alappuzha and pathanamthitta districts. It shares borders with Malakkara, Arattupuzha, Puthancavu, Kurichumuttam and Kalarikode Junction.

Nearby Places
Kalarikode Junction is a Nearest Place,  From Neervilakom.

Temples

Neervilakom is  situated 7 kilometres (4 mi) from Aranmula in Pathanamthiita district, Kerala, India. The main attraction of this place is the ancient temple Shree Dharma Shastha Temple. Lord Ayyappa is the main deity. Thousands of devotees from various places of Central Travancore worship here.

Post Office
There is a post office in the village and the Postal Index Number of Neervilakom is 689122 and is served by Angadical-Chengannur post office.

Economy
This place is remarkably known for its economic contribution to the entire Central Travancore. Majority of the population are NRIs who play very important role in accomplishing the foreign exchange for the nation.

Geography

References

Villages in Pathanamthitta district